The Cundinamarca antpitta (Grallaria kaestneri) is a species of bird in the family Grallariidae. It is endemic to Colombia.

Its natural habitat is subtropical or tropical moist montane forest. It is threatened by habitat loss.

References

External links 
 BirdLife Species Factsheet.

Cundinamarca antpitta
Birds of the Colombian Andes
Endemic birds of Colombia
Cundinamarca antpitta
Taxonomy articles created by Polbot